Gregory Dees (James Gregory Dees), referred to as the father of social entrepreneurship education, was an American scientist, professor, founder and director of the Center for Social Entrepreneurship Development (CASE) of Duke University.

Biography 
Dees was born on October 16, 1950 in Cincinnati, Ohio.

He graduated with a bachelor's degree in philosophy from the University of Cincinnati, a master's degree in public and private management from Yale, and a doctorate in philosophy from Johns Hopkins University.

He co-founded the Center for Social Innovation at Stanford's Graduate School of Business.

Dees joined the faculty of the Duke University Fuqua School of Business as Adjunct Professor of Social Entrepreneurship in 2001.

While at Duke, he co-founded Center for Social Entrepreneurship Development (CASE) with Beth Battle Anderson.

He chaired the World Economic Forum’s Global Agenda Councils on social entrepreneurship and on social innovation.

Dees died on December 20, 2013 while at Duke Hospital.

Publications

Books 
Enterprising Nonprofits: A Toolkit for Social Entrepreneurs (2001)
Strategic Tools for Social Entrepreneurs: Enhancing the Performance of Your Enterprising Nonprofit (2002)

Selected papers 
The Meaning of "Social Entrepreneurship" (1998)
For-Profit Social Ventures (2003)
Taking social entrepreneurship seriously (2007) doi:10.1007/BF02819936

Awards 
 Harvard's Apgar Award for Innovation in Teaching (1995)
The Aspen Institute and Ashoka lifetime achievement award in social entrepreneurship education (2007)

References 

1950 births
2013 deaths
Educators from Cincinnati
Stanford University Graduate School of Business faculty
Duke University faculty
University of Cincinnati alumni
Yale University alumni
Johns Hopkins University alumni